Amrabad (also Romanized as ‘Amrābād; also known as ‘Amrūābād and Umrāo) is a village in Dehaj Rural District, Dehaj District, Shahr-e Babak County, Kerman Province, Iran. At the 2006 census, its population was 110, in 27 families.

References 

Populated places in Shahr-e Babak County